The Slovenian First Futsal League, also known by the abbreviation 1. SFL, is the main futsal league in Slovenia, organized by the Football Association of Slovenia.

History

1984–1995 
The Slovenian Futsal League dates back to 1984, when the tournament system was used to determine the winner. Talci Maribor have won the first championship in the inaugural 1984–85 season. Talci Maribor and Vuko Ljubljana were the most successful teams of the period, winning five and four titles, respectively.

1995–present
The competition in its current format was established in the 1995–96 season, when the tournament was transformed into a league system. Juventus from Šentjur became the first champions with the same number of points (43) as the runners-up Vuko Ljubljana, but with better head-to-head statistics. In the following season Litija won its first title, playing under the name Assaloni Cosmos at the time due to sponsorship reasons. This was the first of the ten titles for Litija who are, as of 2022, the most successful Slovenian futsal team.

2022–23 teams

Champions by year

Performance by club

Top goalscorers by season

References
General

Specific

External links
Official website 

 
Futsal competitions in Slovenia
Slovenia
Sports leagues established in 1995
1995 establishments in Slovenia